During the 1966–67 season Hearts competed in the Scottish First Division, the Scottish Cup and the Scottish League Cup.

Fixtures

Friendlies

League Cup

Scottish Cup

Scottish First Division

See also 
List of Heart of Midlothian F.C. seasons

References 

Statistical Record 66-67

External links 
Official Club website

Heart of Midlothian F.C. seasons
Heart of Midlothian